The M86 expressway is a Hungarian expressway connecting Szombathely to Csorna or Győr, towards to Budapest.

Openings timeline
Szombathely – Vát (9.2 km): 2014.07.24.
Vát bypass (3.8 km): 2009.06.10.
Szeleste bypass (4.6 km): 2010.12.15.
Szeleste – Main road 84 (7.5 km): 2015.09.18.
Main road 84 – Szilsárkány (33.4 km): 2016.10.25.
Csorna bypass; I.section (east) (5 km): 2015.09.09.; (this section was extended 2x3 lane)

Junctions, exits and rest area

 The route is full length expressway.

 Planned section

Maintenance
The operation and maintenance of the road is provided by Hungarian Public Road Nonprofit Pte Ltd Co.
 in Szombathely, mixed
 in Csorna, mixed

Payment
Hungarian system has 2 main types of tolls:

 Time-based fee vignettes (E-matrica); with a validity of either 10 days (3500 HUF), 1 month (4780 HUF), or 1 year (42980 HUF).
 County vignettes (Megyei matrica); instead of the national sticker, the highway can be used with the following county stickers:
{| class="wikitable"
|- 
!Type of county vignette !! Available section
|-
|Vas County
| between Szombathely and Beled (81 km – 124 km)
|-
|Győr-Moson-Sopron County
| between Répcelak and Csorna-north (116 km – 153 km)
|}

See also 

 Roads in Hungary
 Transport in Hungary
 International E-road network

External links 

National Toll Payment Services Plc. (in Hungarian, some information also in English)
 Hungarian Public Road Non-Profit Ltd. (Magyar Közút Nonprofit Zrt.)
 National Infrastructure Developer Ltd.

86